The 2012 Green World ATP Challenger was a professional tennis tournament played on hard courts. It was the second edition of the tournament which was part of the 2012 ATP Challenger Tour. It took place in Pingguo, China between 12 and 18 March 2012.

Single main-draw entrants

Seeds

 1 Rankings are as of March 5, 2012.

Other entrants
The following players received wildcards into the singles main draw:
  Chang Yu
  Feng He
  Ma Ya-nan
  Wang Hufu

The following players received entry from the qualifying draw:
  Bai Yan
  Feng Nian
  Li Yu Cheng
  Christopher Rungkat

Champions

Singles

 Go Soeda def.  Malek Jaziri, 6–1, 3–6, 7–5

Doubles

 John Paul Fruttero /  Raven Klaasen def.  Colin Ebelthite /  Samuel Groth, 6–2, 6–4

External links
ITF Search
ATP official site

Green World ATP Challenger
Green World ATP Challenger
2012 in Chinese tennis